4-Dehydroepiandrosterone (4-DHEA) is a steroid that is an isomer of 5-dehydroepiandrosterone.

4-DHEA has been prepared by laboratory synthesis.

Synonyms
Synonyms for 4-dehydroepiandrosterone are:

3β-Hydroxy-4-androsten-17-one, 3β-hydroxyandrost-4-en-17-one, 3β-hydroxy-D4-androsten-17-one, 3β-hydroxyandrost-4-en-17-one, 3β-hydroxy-etioallocholan-4-en-17-one, and 4-androsten-3β-ol-17-one.

References

Sterols
Androgens and anabolic steroids
Androstanes
Ketones